Yoon Tae-young (born October 3, 1974) is a South Korean actor. He is best known for starring in television dramas, notably fantasy epic The Legend (2007) and sports drama/romance Strike Love (2009).

Personal life
Yoon married actress Im Yoo-jin on February 14, 2007. They met on the 2003 TV drama On the Prairie.

He is the only son of former Samsung Electronics vice chairman Yoon Jong-yong.

Drunk driving incident
On May 13, 2018, Yoon crashed into another car while driving under the influence of alcohol. Yoon was called in the next day to the police station where the police determined that his blood alcohol content was 0.140 percent at the time of the accident. The police suspended his licenses, and after the news broke out, producers of the then upcoming TV series 100 Days My Prince announced their intent to replace him with another actor.

Television series
Local Hero (OCN, 2016)
Drama Special "The Final Puzzle" (KBS2, 2014)
Diary of a Night Watchman (MBC, 2014)
The King's Daughter, Soo Baek-hyang (MBC, 2013-2014)
Midnight Hospital (MBC, 2011)
Strike Love (MBC, 2009)
The Legend (MBC, 2007)
Special Crime Investigation: Murder in the Blue House (KBS2, 2006)
Pearl Necklace (KBS2, 2003-2004)
On the Prairie  (KBS2, 2003)
Nothing Better and Nothing Worse  (MBC, 2002)
Successful Story of a Bright Girl (SBS, 2002)
MBC Best Theater "A Chance"  (MBC, 2002)
Everyday With You (MBC, 2001-2002)
Sun-hee and Jin-hee (MBC, 2001)
Her House (MBC, 2001)
Hotelier (MBC, 2001)
Jump (MBC, 1999)
Wang Cho (The Boss) (MBC, 1999)
Michiko (MBC, 1999)
I Love You, I Love You (SBS, 1997)
Beautiful My Lady (SBS, 1997)

Film
Mr. Socrates (2005)
Never to Lose (2005)
Dream of a Warrior (2001)

Variety show
Survival Quiz of God (jTBC, 2013) - MC
Golf King (TV Chosun, 2022) - Cast Member; Season 3

Awards
2012 한일문화대상: Cultural Diplomacy recipient
2011 MBC Drama Awards: Special Award (Midnight Hospital)
2003 39th Baeksang Arts Awards: Most Popular Actor (TV) 
2002 38th Baeksang Arts Awards: Most Popular Actor (TV) 
2000 36th Baeksang Arts Awards: Best New Actor (TV) (The Boss)
1999 MBC Drama Awards: Best New Actor (The Boss)

References

External links
 Yoon Tae-young at Gallery 9 
 Yoon Tae-young Fan Cafe at Daum 
 
 

South Korean male television actors
South Korean male film actors
1974 births
Living people
People from Yeongcheon
Best New Actor Paeksang Arts Award (television) winners